In mathematical physics the Knizhnik–Zamolodchikov equations, or KZ equations, are linear differential equations satisfied by the correlation functions (on the Riemann sphere) of two-dimensional conformal field theories associated with an affine Lie algebra at a fixed level. They form a system of complex partial differential equations with regular singular points satisfied by the N-point functions of affine primary fields and can be derived using either the formalism of Lie algebras or that of vertex algebras. 

The structure of the genus-zero part of the conformal field theory is encoded in the monodromy properties of these equations. In particular, the braiding and fusion of the primary fields (or their associated representations) can be deduced from the properties  of the four-point functions, for which the equations reduce to a single matrix-valued first-order complex ordinary differential equation of Fuchsian type. 

Originally the Russian physicists Vadim Knizhnik and Alexander Zamolodchikov derived the equations for the SU(2) Wess–Zumino–Witten model using the classical formulas of Gauss for the connection coefficients of the hypergeometric differential equation.

Definition
Let  denote the affine Lie algebra with level  and dual Coxeter number . Let  be a basis of the underlying Lie algebra ,  their representation on the primary field  and  the Killing form. Then for  the Knizhnik–Zamolodchikov equations read

Informal derivation
The Knizhnik–Zamolodchikov equations result from 
the Sugawara construction of the Virasoro algebra from the affine Lie algebra. More specifically, they result from applying the identity 

 

to the affine primary field  in a correlation function of affine primary fields. In this context, only the terms  are non-vanishing. The action of  can then be rewritten using global Ward identities, 

and  can be identified with the infinitesimal translation operator .

Mathematical formulation

The vacuum representation H0 of an affine Kac–Moody algebra at a fixed level can be encoded in a vertex algebra.
The derivation  acts as the energy operator L0 on H0, which can be written as a direct sum of the non-negative integer eigenspaces of L0, the zero energy space being generated by the vacuum vector  Ω. The eigenvalue of an eigenvector of L0 is called its energy. For every state a in L there is a vertex operator V(a,z) which creates a from the vacuum vector Ω, in the sense that

The vertex operators of energy 1 correspond to the generators of the affine algebra

where X ranges over the elements of the underlying finite-dimensional simple complex Lie algebra .

There is an energy 2 eigenvector  which give the generators Ln of the Virasoro algebra associated to the Kac–Moody algebra by the Segal–Sugawara construction

If a has energy , then the corresponding vertex operator has the form

The vertex operators satisfy

as well as the locality and associativity relations

All the structural relations of the Kac–Moody and Virasoro algebra can be recovered from these relations, including the Segal–Sugawara construction.

Every other integral representation Hi at the same level becomes a module for the vertex algebra, in the sense that for each a there is a vertex operator  on Hi such that

The most general vertex operators at a given level are intertwining operators  between representations Hi and Hj where v lies in Hk. These operators can also be written as

but δ can now be rational numbers. Again these intertwining operators are characterized by properties

and relations with L0 and L−1 similar to those above.

Given a chain of n primary fields starting and ending at H0, their correlation or n-point function is defined by

Vertex algebra derivation

first in the w variable around a small circle centred at z; by Cauchy's theorem the result can be expressed as sum of integrals around n small circles centred at the zj's:

Integrating both sides in the z variable about a small circle centred on zi yields the ith Knizhnik–Zamolodchikov equation.

Lie algebra derivation
It is also possible to deduce the Knizhnik–Zamodchikov equations without explicit use of vertex algebras. The term may be replaced in the correlation function by its commutator with Lr where r = 0, ±1. The result can be expressed in terms of the derivative with respect to zi. On the other hand, Lr is also given by the Segal–Sugawara formula:

After substituting these formulas for Lr, the resulting expressions can be simplified using the commutator formulas

Original derivation
First note that for X in 

Hence

On the other hand,

so that

The result follows by using this limit in the previous equality.

Monodromy representation of KZ equation 
In conformal field theory along the above definition the n-point correlation function of the primary field satisfies KZ equation. The correlation function  of the primary fields  's for the representation  takes values in the tensor product  and its KZ equation is
,
where  as the above informal derivation.

Due to this analytic continuation, the holonomy of the KZ equation can be described by the braid group  introduced by Emil Artin. In general, A complex semi-simple Lie algebra  and its representations  give the linear representation of braid group

as the holonomy of KZ equation. Oppositely, a KZ equation gives the linear representation of braid groups as its holonomy.

In particular, if all  's have spin 1/2 representation then the linear representation obtained from KZ equation agrees with the representation constructed from operator algebra theory by Vaughan Jones. It is known that the monodromy representation of KZ equation with a general semi-simple Lie algebra agrees with the linear representation of braid group given by R-matrix of the corresponding quantum group.

Applications
Representation theory of affine Lie algebra and quantum groups
Braid groups
Topology of hyperplane complements
Knot theory and 3-folds

See also
Quantum KZ equations

References

 
 
  (Erratum in volume 19, pp. 675–682.)
 
 

 

Lie algebras
Conformal field theory